Barbu (also Romanized as Barbū) is a village in Bu ol Kheyr Rural District, Delvar District, Tangestan County, Bushehr Province, Iran. At the 2006 census, its population was 42, in 12 families.

References 

Populated places in Tangestan County